The GiMA Best Lyricist is given by Global Indian Music Academy as a part of its annual Global Indian Music Academy Awards.

Superlatives

List of winners
2010 Swanand Kirkire for "Behti Hawa Sa Tha Woh"  – 3 Idiots
2011 Irshad Kamil for "Pee Loon"  – Once Upon A Time In Mumbaai
 Amitabh Bhattacharya for "Ainvayi Ainvayi" – Band Baaja Baaraat
 Faaiz Anwaar for "Tere Mast Mast Do Nain" – Dabangg
 Gulzar for "Darling" – 7 Khoon Maaf
 Kumaar, Vishal Dadlani for "Tujhe Bhula Diya" – Anjaana Anjaani
2012 Irshad Kamil for "Nadaan Parindey"  – Rockstar
 Amitabh Bhattacharya for "Abhi Mujh Mein Kahin" – Agneepath
 Javed Akhtar for "Khwabon Ke Parindey" – Zindagi Na Milegi Dobara
 Javed Akhtar for "Señorita" – Zindagi Na Milegi Dobara
 Prasoon Joshi for "Kaun Si Dor" – Aarakshan
 2013 – (no award given)
 2014 Swanand Kirkire for "Manja"  – Kai Po Che!
 Amitabh Bhattacharya for "Kanira" – Yeh Jawaani Hai Deewani
 Amitabh Bhattacharya for "Sawaar Loon" – Lootera
 Prasoon Joshi for "Zinda" – Bhaag Milkha Bhaag
 Prasoon Joshi for "Bhaag Milkha Bhaag" – Bhaag Milkha Bhaag
 2015 Gulzar for "Bismil"  – Haider
 Amitabh Bhattacharya for "Mast Magan" – 2 States
 Gulzar for "Bismil" – Haider
 Gulzar for "Dil Ka Mizaaj" – Dedh Ishqiya
 Manoj Muntashir for "Galliyan" – Ek Villain
 Swanand Kirkire for "Chaar Kadam" – PK
 2016 Varun Grover for "Moh Moh Ke Dhaage" - Dum Laga Ke Haisha
 Gulzar for "Zinda" – Talvar
 Amitabh Bhattacharya for "Gerua" – Dilwale
 Irshad Kamil for "Agar Tum Saath Ho" – Tamasha
 Kausar Munir for "Tu Jo Mila" – Bajrangi Bhaijaan
 Kumaar for "Sooraj Dooba Hain" – Roy

See also
 Bollywood
 Cinema of India

References

Global Indian Music Academy Awards